is a village located in Nagano Prefecture, Japan. , the village have an estimated population of 1,743 in 721 households, and a population density of 44.6 persons per km².

Geography
Ikusaka is located in the center of Nagano Prefecture. The Ikusaka Dam and Taira Dam are located in the village.

Surrounding municipalities
Nagano Prefecture
 Nagano
 Azumino
 Ōmachi
 Chikuhoku
 Ikeda

Climate
The village has a climate characterized by characterized by hot and humid summers, and cold winters (Köppen climate classification Cfa.  The average annual temperature in Ikusaka is 11.5 °C. The average annual rainfall is 1148 mm with September as the wettest month. The temperatures are highest on average in August, at around 24.8 °C, and lowest in January, at around -1.1 °C.

Demographics 
Per Japanese census data, the population of Ikusaka has decreased by about two-thirds over the past 60 years.

History
The area of present-day Ikusaka was part of ancient Shinano Province. The area was part of the holdings of Matsumoto Domain during the Edo period. The village of Ikusaka was established on April 1, 1889 by the establishment of the modern municipalities system.

Economy
The economy of the village is based on agriculture, with tobacco as the primary crop.

Education
Ikusaka has one public elementary school and one public middle school operated by the village government. The village does not have a high school.

Transportation

Railway
The village does not have any passenger railway service.

Highway

References

External links

Official Website 

 
Villages in Nagano Prefecture